James, son of Alphaeus (Greek: Ἰάκωβος, Iakōbos; Aramaic: ܝܥܩܘܒ ܒܪ ܚܠܦܝ;  Ya'akov ben Halfai;) was one of the Twelve Apostles of Jesus, appearing under this name in all three of the Synoptic Gospels' lists of the apostles. He is generally identified with James the Less (Greek  Iakōbos ho mikros, Mark 15:40) and commonly known by that name in church tradition. He is also labelled "the Minor", "the Little", "the Lesser", or "the Younger", according to translation. He is distinct from James, son of Zebedee and in some interpretations also from James, brother of Jesus (James the Just). He appears only four times in the New Testament, each time in a list of the twelve apostles.

Identity

Possible identity with James the Less
James, son of Alphaeus is often identified with James the Less, who is only mentioned four times in the Bible, each time in connection with his mother. refers to "Mary the mother of James the younger and of Joses", while and (Matthew 27:56) refer to "Mary the mother of James".

Since there was already another James (James, son of Zebedee) among the twelve apostles, equating James son of Alphaeus with "James the Less" made sense. (James son of Zebedee was sometimes called "James the Greater").

Jerome identifies James, son of Alpheus with James the Less writing in his work called The Perpetual Virginity of Blessed Mary the following:

Papias of Hierapolis, who lived circa 70–163 AD, in the surviving fragments of his work Exposition of the Sayings of the Lord relates that Mary, wife of Alphaeus is mother of James the Less:

Therefore, James, son of Alphaeus would be the same as James the Less.

Modern Biblical scholars are divided on whether this identification is correct. John Paul Meier finds it unlikely. Amongst evangelicals, the New Bible Dictionary supports the traditional identification, while Don Carson and Darrell Bock both regard the identification as possible, but not certain.

Possible identification with James, the brother of Jesus
Jerome, apparently voicing the general opinion of Early Church, maintains the doctrine of perpetual virginity of Mary. He proposed that James, son of Alphaeus, was to be identified with "James, the brother of the Lord" (Galatians 1:19) and that the term "brother" was to be understood as "cousin." The view of Jerome, the "Hieronymian view," became widely accepted in the Roman Catholic Church, while Eastern Catholics, Eastern Orthodox and Protestants tend to distinguish between the two. Geike (1884) states that Hausrath, Delitzsch, and Schenkel think James the brother of Jesus was the son of Clophas-Alphaeus.

In two small but potentially important works ascribed by some to Hippolytus, On the Twelve Apostles of Christ and On the Seventy Apostles of Christ, he relates the following:

It is important to remember that James, the brother of Jesus is attributed the same death; he was stoned to death by the Jews too. This testimony of "Hippolytus", if authentic, would increase the plausibility that James the son of Alphaeus is the same person as James the brother of Jesus.

These two works of "Hippolytus" are often neglected because the manuscripts were lost during most of the church age and then found in Greece in the 19th century. As most scholars consider them spurious, they are often ascribed to "". The two are included in an appendix to the works of Hippolytus in the voluminous collection of Early Church Fathers.

According to the surviving fragments of the work Exposition of the Sayings of the Lord by Papias of Hierapolis Cleophas and Alphaeus are the same person, Mary wife of Cleophas or Alphaeus would be the mother of James, the brother of Jesus, and of Simon and Judas (Thaddeus), and of one Joseph.

Thus, James, the brother of the Lord would be the son of Alphaeus, who is the husband of Mary of Cleophas or Mary the wife of Alphaeus. However, the Anglican theologian J.B. Lightfoot maintains that the fragment in question is spurious.

As reported by the Golden Legend, which is a collection of hagiographies compiled by Jacobus de Voragine in the thirteenth century:

Possible brother of Matthew
The four times that James son of Alphaeus is mentioned directly in the Bible (each time in the list of the Apostles) the only family relationship stated is that his father is Alphaeus. In two lists of the Apostles, the other James and John are listed as brothers and that their father is Zebedee.

Gospel sources

Gospel of Mark

Calling of James, son of Alphaeus
Mark the Evangelist is the earliest known source in the Bible to mention "James, son of Alphaeus" as one of the twelve Apostles. Mark the Evangelist mentions a "James, son of Alphaeus" only once and this is in his list of the 12 Apostles. At the beginning of Jesus' ministry he first calls Peter and his brother Andrew and asks them to follow him. In the next verses it tells the story of how James the Greater and his brother John the Apostle came to follow Jesus. After some healing by Jesus he meets Levi son of Alphaeus who was a tax collector and he then asks Levi (better known as Matthew) to follow him ( and ). Peter, Andrew, James the Greater and John the Apostle are listed as Apostles. Levi, son of Alphaeus is listed as an Apostle under the name of Matthew and James alone is listed as the son of Alphaeus.

Ambiguous Jameses
Overall, Mark the Evangelist lists three different Jameses: "James, son of Alphaeus", James the Greater and James the brother of Jesus. On three separate occasions he writes about a James without clarifying which James he is referring to. There is a James at the transfiguration, at the Mount of Olives, and the Garden of Gethsemane, . Although this James is listed alongside John the Apostle, a clear distinction isn't made about which Apostle James is being referred to, even when both Apostles are meant to be in a similar location. All twelve Apostles attend the Last Supper which immediately precedes the Garden of Gethsemane. There is a reference to Mary mother of James the Younger and Joseph; however, Mark the Evangelist has already told us that James the brother of Jesus has a brother called Joseph.

Gospel of Matthew

Calling of James, son of Alphaeus
Peter, Andrew, James, son of Zebedee and his brother John were all called to follow Jesus. In a story that parallels the calling of Levi, son of Alphaeus, Matthew is called to follow Jesus. Matthew is never referred directly to as being the Son of Alphaeus in the Gospel of Matthew or any other book in the Bible, but as Levi, Son of Alphaeus. In Mark he is regarded as a tax collector. In the Gospel of Matthew the tax collector (Matthew) called to follow Jesus is listed as one of the twelve Apostles. James, son of Alphaeus is also listed as one of the 12 Apostles.

Ambiguous Jameses
Matthew doesn't mention any James in his Gospel that isn't identified without association to his family. There are 3 James that are mentioned by Matthew; James, Brother of Jesus, Joseph, Simon and Judas, James son of Zebedee and brother of John and James, son of Alphaeus. At the Transfiguration it is specified that the James is brother of John and at the Garden of Gethsemane it is specified that it is the son of Zebedee. It is not specified by Matthew that there was a James at the Mount of Olives; he mentions only disciples. Matthew also mentions a Mary the mother of James and Joseph who was at the crucifixion. This James is not given the epithet the younger.

Death
A James was arrested along with some other Christians and was executed by King Herod Agrippa in his persecution of the church. However, the James in  has a brother called John. James, son of Zebedee has a brother called John and we are never explicitly told that James son of Alphaeus has a brother. Robert Eisenman  and Achille Camerlynck both suggest that the death of James in Acts 12:1–2 is James, son of Zebedee and not James son of Alphaeus.

In Christian art, James the Less is depicted holding a fuller's club. One tradition maintains that he was crucified at Ostrakine in Lower Egypt, where he was preaching the Gospel.

References

Christian saints from the New Testament
Saints from the Holy Land
Twelve Apostles
1st-century Christian martyrs
Year of birth unknown
James, brother of Jesus